Sihle Magongoma (born 9 October 1995) is a South African cricketer. He made his first-class debut for Border in the 2018–19 CSA 3-Day Provincial Cup on 22 November 2018. He made his List A debut for Border in the 2018–19 CSA Provincial One-Day Challenge on 4 November 2018.

References

External links
 

1998 births
Living people
South African cricketers
Border cricketers
Eastern Province cricketers
Place of birth missing (living people)